Breidvågnipa Peak is a peak,  high, rising  southeast of Mount Hiroe on the coast of Queen Maud Land, Antarctica. It was mapped by Norwegian cartographers from air photos taken by the Lars Christensen Expedition, 1936–37, and named "Breidvågnipa" (the "broad bay peak") in association with nearby Breidvåg Bight.

References 

Mountains of Queen Maud Land
Prince Harald Coast